Ruckus is the fourth studio album by the New Orleans, LA based band Galactic.  It was produced by Dan the Automator. This marks the last studio album for Theryl DeClouet, leaving for health reasons.

Track listing
 "Bittersweet"  – 3:29
 "Bongo Joe"  – 3:21
 "The Moil"  – 3:11
 "Paint"  – 3:19
 "Never Called You Crazy"  – 3:08
 "Gypsy Fade"  – 3:28
 "Mercamon"  – 3:12
 "Uptown Odyssey"  – 3:13
 "Kid Kenner"  – 3:25
 "The Beast"  – 2:49
 "Tenderness"  – 3:46 (General Public Cover)
 "All Behind You Now"  – 3:40
 "Doomed"  – 3:56

Chart performance

Album

Personnel
Galactic:
Theryl DeClouet - vocals
Ben Ellman - harmonica, programming, saxophone
Robert Mercurio - bass, vocals (background)
Charles daffron - drums
Stanton Moore - loops
Richard Vogel - keyboards
Jeffrey Raines - guitars

Teedy Boutte - vocals  
Jim Greer & The Mac-O-Chee Valley Folks - guitar, keyboards  
Scott Harding - engineer  
Glenn Hartman - accordion  
Howie Weinberg - mastering  
John Lee Hardee - second engineer

References

External links
 Official Galactic site

2003 albums
Galactic albums
Sanctuary Records albums
Albums produced by Dan the Automator